Beslan Zaudinovich Mudranov (born 7 July 1986) (Circassian: Мудран Беслъэн) is a Russian judoka (since 2008) and former Sambo wrestler (2003–2008) of Circassian descent. He won two gold medals in 2012 European Judo Championships and 2014 European Judo Championships. His coach is Rudolf Mikhailovich Baboyan. Beslan earned Russia's first gold medal at the 2016 Summer Olympics in Rio de Janeiro.

Personal life
Mudranov was born in 1986 in Baksan, Kabardino-Balkar ASSR. He began training in martial arts at the age of 13. Upon the recommendation of his younger brother, he started as a Sambist, then also practised freestyle wrestling. After moving to Maykop, Beslan was enrolled at the Adyghe State University in the Institute of Physical Culture and Judo. In 2006 he moved to Armavir, and two years later he switched to judo.

Beslan's father, Zaudin Shafigovich, is an over-the-road trucker, and his mother, Asya Khasanovna, a housewife. His brother Aslan (born 1987) is a Merited Master of Sports in Sambo and judo.

Beslan is married, and the couple has a daughter.

References

External links

 
 
 
 
 

1986 births
Living people
Circassians
Circassian people of Russia
European Games gold medalists for Russia
European Games medalists in judo
Judoka at the 2015 European Games
Judoka at the 2016 Summer Olympics
Medalists at the 2016 Summer Olympics
Olympic gold medalists for Russia
Olympic judoka of Russia
Olympic medalists in judo
Russian male judoka
Russian sambo practitioners
Sportspeople from Kabardino-Balkaria